The University Athletic Association of the Philippines (UAAP) holds its basketball tournaments, which were held from September to December. There were a total of 8 participating teams.

Elimination round

Postseason

Phil
Volley
UAAP Season 56
UAAP volleyball tournaments